Komyshnia is an urban-type settlement in Myrhorod Raion of Poltava Oblast in Ukraine. It is located on the Khorol, a right tributary of the Psel in the drainage basin of the Dnieper. Komyshnia hosts the administration of Komyshnia settlement hromada, one of the hromadas of Ukraine. Population:

Economy

Transportation

Thew settlement is connected by roads with Myrhorod to the south, Lubny to the southwest, Lokhvytsia to the northwest, and Hadiach to the northeast.

References

Urban-type settlements in Myrhorod Raion
Mirgorodsky Uyezd